Arsu was a god worshipped in Palmyra, Syria.

A deity known from Syrian and northern Arabian lands, being sometimes in male or in female (most often) representation. Arsu was connected with the evening star.

Frequently portrayed as riding a camel and accompanied by his twin brother Azizos; both were regarded as the protectors of caravans. His worship is also confirmed by material evidences in Temple of Adonis, Dura-Europos. In the temple complex there was a relief, which shows Arsu on a camel. The inscription under the figure goes: "Oga the sculptor has made (this to) 'Arsu the camel-rider, for the life of his son". It is likely he was associated with the planet Mercury early on.

Elsewhere in pre-Islamic Arabia, he was equated with Ruda (literally benign).

References

Arabian gods
Stellar gods
Venusian deities
Palmyra
Divine twins